Politics in America (PIA) is a reference work comprising non-partisan profiles and assessments of every member of the United States Congress published by CQ Press. Compiled by a staff of more than three dozen Congressional Quarterly, Capitol Hill reporters and editors, Politics in America is published biennially. The profiles offer concise and candid analysis of personalities, political styles, legislative agendas, political ambitions, and reputations of members at home and on Capitol Hill. Detailed state and district information plus a wealth of information and data on campaign finance, partisan caucuses, standing committees, and other member facts round out the book.

Profile includes
 Biographical data
 Committee assignments
 Interest group ratings
 Contact information
 State-by-state and congressional voting demographics
 Campaign finance statistics and election results
 Leadership, caucuses, and member statistics

References 

Almanacs
Biographical dictionaries
Political science books